Ishan Parbat is a mountain of the Kumaon Himalaya in Uttarakhand India also called Adi Kailash II. It is joint 154th highest located entirely within the Uttrakhand. Nanda Devi, is the highest mountain in this category. It lies 1.1km SW of Adi Kailash  and 4.9km NNW of Brammah Parvat  its nearest higher neighbor. It lies 12.7km NW of Rajay Jue . It is located 16.3km WSW of Sangthang  and 22km west lies Panchchuli II .

Climbing history

A British American team led by Martin Moran venture in Adi Kailash Range in 2006. They camped at Nikurch Rama for an ascent on Ishan Parvat. They knew this approach route to Adi Kailash from there previous visit in 2004. On 28 September they made a load-ferry to a summit camp at 5400m in the snow bowl. On 29 they started at 1 A.M. Martin Welch had fixed a rope to reach the col at 5825 m. Finally a simple snow ridge to a final rock outcrop. At 9 a.m. they reached the summit. Seveven member including local porter Mangal singh reached the summit.

Neighboring and subsidiary peaks
neighboring or subsidiary peaks of Ishan Parvat:
 Panchchuli II: 
 Sangthang: 
 Brammah Parvat: 
 Rajay Jue:

Glaciers and rivers
Nama glacier this 5 km long glacier flows NE towards Kuthi. The glacier has three feeder streams.

Rama glacier The biggest glacier of this range flows NW from Brammah Parvat and Cheepaydang to the main Darma valley.

Lebong glacier This short glacier lies on the W side of the Shin la and terminates at 4400 m above Bidang grazings.

Nikurch Rama glacier This glacier feeds the Kuthi Yankti and is surrounded by Adi Kailash, Ishan Parvat, Brammah Parvat NE Top and Nikurch Quilla. The glacier splits into two branches.
 
Chatem glacier Named after a small shrine of worship for local shepherds above its Northern bank, the Chatem glacier drains the SE wall of Brammah Parvat.

Ganna glacier

See also

 List of Himalayan peaks of Uttarakhand

References

Mountains of Uttarakhand
Six-thousanders of the Himalayas
Geography of Chamoli district